The Davidson Building is a historic building located in Sioux City, Iowa, United States.  It was constructed by local businessmen and real estate developers Ben and Dave Davidson.  They saw the need for an upscale office building for professionals.  They hired prominent local architect William L. Steele to design the Early Commercial-style structure.  It was built by the leading contractor in the city, Lytle Construction Company.  Completed in 1913, it was Sioux City's first office building.  The exterior of the L-shaped, six-story building is composed of terra cotta panels separated by vertical bands of Roman style brick, and capped with an ornate cornice.  It is Sullivanesque in its design.  Commercial space is located on the first floor, and office space occupies the upper floors.  The building was listed on the National Register of Historic Places in 1999.  In 2016 plans were unveiled to convert the building and the adjacent Warrior Hotel into a boutique hotel and apartments. The Davidson Building houses The Warrior Apartments, as well as 56 guest rooms for The Warrior Hotel on its second, third and fourth floors.

References

External links
The Warrior Apartments - official website

Commercial buildings completed in 1913
Chicago school architecture in Iowa
Commercial buildings on the National Register of Historic Places in Iowa
National Register of Historic Places in Sioux City, Iowa
Buildings and structures in Sioux City, Iowa
William L. Steele buildings
1913 establishments in Iowa